Bismarck or Bismarck 1862–1898 is a 1927 German silent historical film directed by Kurt Blachy and starring Franz Ludwig, Robert Leffler and Erna Morena. It was made as a follow-up to the 1925 film Bismarck which had also starred Ludwig. Because of this it is sometimes referred to as Bismarck Part II. The film depicts the latter part of Otto von Bismarck's career including his long spell as Chancellor of Germany.

The film's sets were designed by the art director Willi Herrmann.

The film was poorly received by the political right who accused it of "reducing a genius to the level of banality".

Cast

References

Bibliography

External links

1927 films
1920s historical films
1920s biographical films
German historical films
German biographical films
Films of the Weimar Republic
Films directed by Kurt Blachy
German silent feature films
Films set in the 19th century
Films set in Prussia
Cultural depictions of Otto von Bismarck
German black-and-white films
1920s German films